Tigerlily is the debut studio album by American singer-songwriter Natalie Merchant, released on June 20, 1995, following her departure from the alternative rock band 10,000 Maniacs. 

Tigerlily peaked at No. 13 on the Billboard 200 album chart and was certified five-times platinum by the Recording Industry Association of America in 2001. It contained three singles that charted in the Billboard Hot 100: "Carnival" (No. 10), "Wonder" (No. 20), and "Jealousy" (No. 23).

Re-releases 

Tigerlily was re-released in 1996 as a 2-CD set, with the second CD containing a remix of the song "Jealousy" and live performances from her tour.

In 2015, to commemorate the album's 20th anniversary, Merchant rerecorded the songs from the album and released them as Paradise Is There: The New Tigerlily Recordings.

Background
The song "River" is a tribute to River Phoenix.

Aileen Wuornos had requested that Merchant's song "Carnival" be played at her funeral, and the song later appeared in the credits of the 2003 documentary Aileen: Life and Death of a Serial Killer. Merchant later commented:

Reception
Reviews of Tigerlily were mostly positive. David Browne of Entertainment Weekly gave the album a B+ rating, observing that, "with its unadorned, keyboard-based arrangements, Tigerlily is more sparely produced than anything Merchant did with 10,000 Maniacs, yet the starkness works in her favor. ... The hooks on this album are subtler, and ultimately Merchant sounds both more natural and affecting." While Browne expressed a desire for Merchant to "lighten up," he also praised her "uncompromising vision."

In the Los Angeles Times 1995 Holiday Gift Guide, Jean Rosenbluth awarded the album three stars out of four, stating, "A rejuvenated Merchant sounds considerably more mature and womanly than the 10,000 Maniacs gave her room to be. Positive progress for a talent that is still in bloom."

Al Weisel of Rolling Stone gave the album one and a half stars out of five, calling the album "bloodless and limp," and claiming Merchant's voice had "nearly deteriorated into self-parody." Weisel added, "With its surfeit of blindly self-obsessed lyrics and lulling lite-rock arrangements, the bulk of Tigerlily provides a perfect soundtrack for the Prozac nation."

In a retrospective review for AllMusic, Stephen Thomas Erlewine awarded the album four and a half stars out of five, concluding that "the added emphasis on rhythmic texture works, creating an intimate but not exclusive atmosphere that holds throughout the record, even when her occasionally sophomoric, sentimental poetry threatens to sink the album in the weight of its own preciousness."

Track listing

Personnel 
 Natalie Merchant – vocals, acoustic piano, organ, vibraphone
 Jennifer Turner – acoustic guitar, electric guitar, backing vocals
 Matt Henderson – electric guitar (1), bass guitar (1)
 John Holbrook – electric guitar (1, 9), organ (3, 9)
 Barrie Maguire – 12-string electric guitar, bass guitar (2-11)
 Eric Schenkman – electric guitar (9)
 Peter Yanowitz – drums, percussion
 Randy Grant – percussion (1)
 Adrián López Guevarra – percussion (5, 10)
 Jay Ungar – violin (8)
 Michelle Kinney – cello (11)
 Katell Keineg – backing vocals (5)

Production
 John Holbrook – engineer, mixing 
 Paul Antonell – assistant engineer 
 Todd Vos – assistant engineer 
 Suzanne Dyer – assistant mix engineer 
 Andrew Page – assistant mix engineer 
 Bob Ludwig – mastering at Gateway Mastering (Portland, Maine) 
 Natalie Merchant – package design 
 Frank Olinsky – package design 
 Dan Borris – photography 
 José Picayo – band photography 
 Barbara Carr and Jon Landau at Jon Landau Management – management

Charts

Weekly charts

Year-end charts

Certifications

Notes 

1995 debut albums
Elektra Records albums
Natalie Merchant albums